The 1999 Big South Conference baseball tournament  was the postseason baseball tournament for the Big South Conference, held from May 20 through 23 at Charles Watson Stadium, home field of regular season champion Coastal Carolina in Conway, South Carolina.  The top six finishers from the regular season participated in the double-elimination tournament. The champion, won the title for the third time, and first since 1987, and earned an invitation to the 1999 NCAA Division I baseball tournament.

Format
The top six finishers from the regular season qualified for the tournament.  The teams were seeded one through six and played a double-elimination tournament.  New members Elon and High Point were ineligible for conference competition, making all returning members automatically qualifying for the event.

Bracket and results

All-Tournament Team

Most Valuable Player
Matt Kozaria was named Tournament Most Valuable Player.  Kozaria was a pitcher for Winthrop.

References

Tournament
Big South Conference Baseball Tournament
Big South baseball tournament
Big South Conference baseball tournament